Senator Ogden may refer to:

Aaron Ogden (1756–1839), New Jersey State Senate
Steve Ogden (born 1950), Texas State Senate